Wulai District (Atayal: Ulay) is a mountain indigenous district in southern New Taipei City in northern Taiwan. It sits near the border with Taipei and is famous for its hot springs. It is the largest district in New Taipei, as well as the most mountainous, and is home to the indigenous Atayal people.

Name
The name of the town derives from the Atayal phrase kilux ulay meaning "hot and poisonous" when an Atayal hunter hunting by a stream saw mist coming from the stream.

History
Formerly classified as "Aboriginal Area" under Taihoku Prefecture during Japanese rule. After the handover of Taiwan from Japan to the Republic of China in 1945, Wulai was organized as a rural township of Taipei County.

On June 22, 2001, President Chen Shui-bian visited a local school and hosted the graduation ceremony.

On 25 December 2010, Taipei County was upgraded to a special municipality named New Taipei City and Wulai was upgraded into a district.

In August 2015, Wulai was devastated by Typhoon Soudelor, wiping out several hotels and destroying hot springs in the region. Course of the Nanshi River that passes through the district has changed and the riverbank was eroded heavily by surging water. Heavy landslides were attributed to the overdevelopment of the mountain areas around the river which damaged the soil and watershed along the slope lands.

Geography

 Elevation:  (average)
 Area: 
 Population: 6,327 People (February 2023)

Administrative divisions
Wulai District is divided into five urban villages:
 Zhongzhi/Jhongjhih, Wulai, Xiaoyi/Siaoyi, Xinxian/Sinsian and Fushan Village.

Tourist attractions
Wulai is a tourist town most renowned for its hot springs, sightseeing, and aboriginal culture. Other activities include hiking, camping, swimming, fishing, and birdwatching. During the spring, visitors come see the cherry trees bloom. According to locals, bathing in the odorless hot springs can cure skin diseases (such as ringworm, eczema, and herpes).
 Fushan Botanical Garden
 Neidong National Forest Recreation Area
 Wulai Atayal Museum
 Wulai Forestry Life Museum
 Wulai Old Street
 Yun Hsien Resort
 Wulai Hot Spring – visitors often go to the numerous hot spring hotels, public baths, as well as the Nanshi River.
 Waterfalls – Several waterfalls exist in the Wulai gorge, but the largest is Wulai Waterfall.
 Wulai Gondola – the gondola takes visitors to the top of Wulai Waterfall, where it accesses the Yun Hsien Resort.
 Atayal aboriginal culture – many shops in Wulai specialize in aboriginal foods, arts, crafts, and clothing.

Transportation

Road
Wulai District is accessible by Xindian Bus from Xindian Station of Taipei Metro to Wulai Bus Terminus.

The 9A branch line of the Provincial Highway 9 passes through the district.

Rail
The district also has the Wulai Scenic Train, a converted mine train built during the Japanese era that takes visitors from downtown Wulai to the attractions at the base of Wulai Waterfall.

Notable people
 Tony Coolidge (1970-), Atayal-American filmmaker

Gallery

See also
 New Taipei

References

External links

  
 台北縣烏來鄉簡介 - 烏來四季1 ('Introduction to Wulai Township, Taipei County - The Four Seasons in Wulai, Part 1') 

 
Taiwan placenames originating from Formosan languages